Borj in North Khorasan may refer to:
 Borj, Bojnord
 Borj, Esfarayen
 Borj-e Aqa
 Borj-e Zanganlu
 Borj-e Zavalfaqar